Aphanius darabensis, the Kol toothcarp, is a species of pupfish belonging to the family Cyprinodontidae. It can be found in the Golabi spring near the city of Darab in the Fars Province, Iran. The species is threatened by droughts and the introduction of invasive species.

Etymology 
The scientific name, darabensis, comes from Darab, a city in Iran, as the species is found in a spring near to this location.

Description 
The Kol toothcarp, like all members of the genus Aphanius, display sexual dimorphism. Males have 9-18 flank bars, whereas females bear small vertical brown patches on their flanks.

References 

Aphanius
Fish of Iran
Taxa named by Hamid Reza Esmaeili
Taxa named by Azad Teimori
Taxa named by Zeinab Gholami
Taxa named by Bettina Reichenbacher
Fish described in 2014